Mobinnet is one of the largest Internet service providers of wireless broadband in Iran that provides high-speed LTE services, connectivity network solutions, dedicated bandwidth, data center, digital services such a services that connects homes and businesses through a suitable and extensive infrastructure across the country. This company was founded in December 2008 and on 29th of January in 2017, it has established its nationwide wireless network based on TD-LTE technology. Alongside home internet services, wide range of communication and internet services for organizations has turned Mobinnet to be known as one of the largest wireless internet service providers for businesses. With reliance on progresses in LTE technology, national wireless network, radio links and equipped data center, Mobinnet is currently extending services nationwide through maximum number of locations in Iran.

Products and services
High-speed TD-LTE Internet
Broadband Internet
VPN
Data Center
Internet of things

References

Internet service providers of Iran
Telecommunications companies established in 2008